The Schulich School of Medicine & Dentistry is the combined medical school and dental school of the University of Western Ontario, one of 17 medical schools in Canada and one of six in Ontario.

History 
The medical school at the University of Western Ontario was founded under the guidance of Bishop Isaac Hellmuth in 1881. At the time, the university was already at capacity with other departments, so most lectures were to be taken place in a small, five-room cottage. The first lecture was given on October 1, 1882. In 1888, a separate faculty building was opened on the corner of York and Waterloo in London, Ontario. The dental school was founded in 1964 and the first classes started in 1966. The two schools merged in 1997. The school is the seventh oldest in Canada, and the third in Ontario after Toronto's and Queen's medical schools. Schulich Medical School is based in London, with an undergraduate medical campus in Windsor. It consistently ranks as one of the top medical schools in Canada.

The school emphasizes a patient-centered approach to medicine, introducing new students to clinical methods in the first few weeks just like every other Canadian medical school. Schulich has consistently done well in residency matches, with the fourth highest match rate in Canada in 2012 (95.9%). The school has produced a number of notable alumni, including the discoverer of Barr bodies Murray Barr, "the Father of Family Medicine" Ian McWhinney, and the former Director-general of the World Health Organization (WHO) Margaret Chan.

Like other Canadian medical schools, admission to Schulich School of Medicine is highly competitive. The school receives more than ten times as many applications as there are places available. For the 2012/2013 cycle, Schulich received 14 applications for each available place with an acceptance rate of less than 7%.

The school is named after Seymour Schulich who donated $26 million in 2004 to the university. This was the largest donation ever received by the university, at the time.

Admissions
The Doctor of Medicine (MD) program at the Schulich School of Medicine & Dentistry receives approximately 2000 applications each year, of which 450 applicants are invited to interview for 171 spots (133 London campus and 38 Windsor campus). Schulich Medicine is unique in that it does not require prerequisite courses, thus encouraging students from a variety of disciplines to apply. Furthermore, no preference or advantage is given to specific programs. Schulich Medicine does not accept international students for the undergraduate program, but does accept students from provinces outside of Ontario.

Minimum requirements
Applicants are invited to interview based on minimum grade point average (GPA) and Medical College Admission Test (MCAT) requirements. For the 2021 application cycle, these minimums were a 3.70 GPA. MCAT of 380 total. Minimum score of in each of the following sections of: BBFLS 126, CPBS 127, CARS 127 on the MCAT. These cutoffs vary year to year based on the applicant pool. Students whose scores below any of the cut-offs are not considered and will automatically not receive an invitation to an interview. Students from Southwestern Ontario are required to have the same academic credentials, but are allowed to have slightly lower MCAT scores for individual sections (no lower than 8/section, but 32 overall still required). It is unknown if these students receive an advantage post-interview, as Schulich Medicine does not disclose their admission calculations. Furthermore, credentials for the matriculating class are not released to the public, but have been historically higher than the minimum requirements.

Degrees offered

Medicine (MD)
The school's medical program consists of four years of studies; two of which are pre-clerkship, one is a rotating clerkship and the final year is an integration and consolidation year devoted to electives in preparation for the chosen speciality of the student.

Dentistry (DDS)
The school's dentistry program is a four-year program offering a Doctor of Dental Surgery (DDS) degree. The school also offers Canada's first accredited Qualifying Program for Internationally Trained Dentists (ITD), as well as a post-graduate programs in Clinical Orthodontics.

Medical science (BMSc)
The medical science undergraduate program is a joint program offered by the Schulich School of Medicine and Dentistry and the University of Western Ontario.

Full list of degree programs offered
Doctor of Medicine (MD)
Doctor of Dental Surgery (DDS)
48 postgraduate medicine (residency) training programs
Bachelor of Medical Sciences (BMSc)
MSc & PhD programs in basic and clinical sciences
Combined MD/PhD
Combined MD/DDS (Oral & Maxillofacial Surgery Residency)
Graduate Orthodontics
Qualifying Program (for foreign-trained dental graduates)

Research
Undergraduate medical and dental students have the opportunity to conduct basic or clinical research under the supervision of a Schulich faculty member in the London or Windsor area. There are two main programs: Summer Research Training Program (SRTP) and Schulich Research Opportunities Program (SROP).

Summer Research Training Program
The goal of the SRTP program is to introduce medical students to basic or clinical research and stimulate their interest in academic medicine. Students pursue a medical research project during the summer months for two years prior to clerkship. Dental students have similar opportunities. A two-year commitment is mandatory for medical students to fully develop the project; as such, only first year student may apply to the program. However, for dental students such two year commitment is not obliged. Approximately 10-15 students are selected to enter these programs, depending on the feasibility of the project and the availability of funds. The Schulich School of Medicine & Dentistry provides funding for the student equal to the current Canadian Institutes of Health Research (CIHR) Summer Studentship rate.

Medical students are required to attend weekly seminars during five of the ten summer months, where they listen to and critique other projects. An interim report is required at the end of the first summer, and students are required to present their final results at the SRTP Student Symposium at the end of the second summer. Students are also eligible for awards at the completion of the program. Historically, students have been successful in producing publications and conference abstracts.

Proposed projects are made available online each January. Students are invited to review the projects, contact faculty, and apply to the program. Applications are due in February, with funding decisions finalized in March.

COVID-19 pandemic 
During the COVID-19 pandemic, faculty and students of the school have engaged in research to advance candidate vaccines and other topics related to the virus. Funding for this research came from the Canadian Institutes of Health Research, Natural Sciences and Engineering Research Council, Social Sciences and Humanities Research Council, International Development Research Centre and Genome Canada.

 Communications - Researcher Anita Kothari and Nursing professor Lorie Donelle received a $129,600 grant in March 2020 to develop a social media toolkit to assist public health officials in communication information to the public during a viral outbreak, as well as to study social media's role in the spread of misinformation.
 Vaccines and therapeutics - Health Studies professor and Health Ethics, Law, & Policy (HELP) Lab co-director Maxwell Smith received a $283,656 grant in March 2020 to support expedited research and development of COVID-19 vaccines and treatments for the disease. Later that month an additional $998,840 was awarded to a team led by Schulich researchers Eric Arts, Stephen Barr, Chil-Yong Kang, and Ryan Troyer to "establish and test" a vaccine candidate against SARS-CoV-2, and to develop a "vaccine bank" to store vaccines for deployment against future coronavirus outbreaks.

Affiliated teaching hospitals

Notable faculty and alumni

Since their founding, the medical and dental schools have produced a number of famous physicians and inventors, including: 
Frederick Banting: Surgeon; primary discoverer of insulin; lecturer in orthopedics and anthropology (1920-1921)
Margaret Chan: Former Director-General of the World Health Organization (WHO)

Jane Philpott: Current Minister of Health and Member of Parliament for Markham-Stouffville 
Henry J.M. Barnett: Neurologist; expert in the medical management of stroke; along with Charles Drake, co-founder of the Department of Clinical Neurological Sciences at University Hospital (London)
Charles G. Drake: Neurosurgeon; established the University of Western Ontario as a neurosurgical centre of excellence; pioneered treatment of vertebral basilar aneurysms
Gary G. Ferguson: Neurosurgeon; internationally recognized as a leader on research in stroke prevention surgery
Ian McWhinney: Family physician; known as the "Father of Family Medicine"; established the Centre for Studies in Family Medicine, often regarded as the premier research centre in Family Medicine in Canada
David Jaffray: a pioneer in medical imaging and professor at the University of Toronto

Henri Breault: Chief of Pediatrics and Director of the Poison Control Centre at Hotel Dieu Hospital; he was instrumental in the creation of the first child-proof container
Robert Noble: involved in the discovery of vinblastine
Murray Barr: discovered an important cell structure named after him: Barr body, an inactive X chromosome in a female somatic cell, rendered inactive by lyonization
Gopal Bhatnagar: Head of Cardiovascular Surgery unit at the Trillium Health Centre; he led the team that performed the first cardiopulmonary bypass surgery in Canada in 2004 using the new Sorin mini-bypass technology
Jock McKeen: co-founder of the Haven Institute with Bennet Wong
John David Spence: Medical researcher and professor at the University of Western Ontario
Paul Polak: co-founder and CEO of Windhorse International
A. Albert Yuzpe: obstetrician-gynecologist; known for his work on human fertility and emergency contraception. The Yuzpe regimen, is named after him
Barry A. Love: cardiologist; director of the Congenital Cardiac Catheterization Laboratory and director of the Pediatric Electrophysiology Service at the Mount Sinai Medical Center and assistant professor of both pediatrics and cardiology at the Mount Sinai School of Medicine
Jonathan Larmonth Meakins:surgeon, expert in immunobiology and surgical infections; the fourth person and first Canadian appointed Nuffield Professor of Surgery Professor at University of Oxford. He is a Fellow of Balliol College, Oxford and leads the Nuffield Department Surgery
William James Roche: Canadian politician and Conservative Member of Parliament
Donald Rix:  pathologist and philanthropist
Thomas Chisholm: lecturer
Melanie Kok: Olympic Canadian rower
James Collip: dean of medicine at the University of Western Ontario, and part of the Toronto group which isolated insulin
Lawrence Sealewyn Holmes: dermatologist and radiologist; noted philatelist
John G. Kelton: dean of medicine at McMaster University Medical School and the McMaster Faculty of Health Sciences, developed a diagnostic test for heparin-induced thrombocytopenia
Danielle Martin: Canadian physician, health care administrator, author and an associate professor at the University of Toronto.

See also

Books
 Murray Llewellyn Barr 'A century of medicine at Western: a centennial history of the Faculty of Medicine, University of Western Ontario' (London: University of Western Ontario, 1977)
 John R. W. Gwynne-Timothy 'Western's first century' (London: University of Western Ontario, 1978)
 Ruth Davis Talman 'The beginnings and development of the University of Western Ontario, 1878-1924.' (MA Thesis, University of Western Ontario, 1925)

References

Medical schools in Canada
University of Western Ontario
Dental schools in Canada